Fontes do Ipiranga Biological Reserve is a biological reserve in the Fontes do Ipiranga State Park in São Paulo State, Brazil.

Location
The Fontes do Ipiranga State Park is located in the south of the city of São Paulo. It holds the biological reserve, which preserves a remnant of Atlantic Forest vegetation and fauna, as well as the  São Paulo Botanical Garden (Jardim Botânico de São Paulo).

It contains rainforest vegetation mixed with Araucaria in various stages of succession.

History

In the 1920s the Horto Botânico, now the Botanical Garden, was established in the park area.

During the 1930s the city's water supply was overhauled and the park was no longer a source.

The site went through a series of changes in use and administration over the years that followed.

The park was formally constituted by decree on 12 August 1969. The Água Funda Park was now called the Fontes do Ipiranga State Park. The decree defined a Biological Reserve area, Zoological garden, Botanical garden forest area and various open areas.

The Biological Reserve was to be kept intact as a scientific repository of the existing biota and to protect the historical headwaters of the Ipiranga River.

The reserve shows evidence of human influences such as construction in the surrounding area, introduction of exotic species and deforestation. In October 2012 it was reported that the governor of the state was planning to build a concert arena, hotel complex and exhibition centre in the State park.

Notes

Sources

Biological reserves of Brazil
Protected areas of São Paulo (state)
Protected areas established in 1969
1969 establishments in Brazil
Protected areas of the Atlantic Forest